Catherine Chabaud (born 29 November 1962) is a French navigator, journalist and politician of the Democratic Movement (MoDem) who was elected as a Member of the European Parliament in 2019.

Career in sports
In 1997 Chabaud became the first woman to complete the Vendee Globe yacht race a solo round the World non-stop race finishing 6th in 3rd edition. She is the only female to have skippered the winning entry on corrected time in the Fastnet Race, doing so in 1999.

Political career
After Chabaud returned from her circumnavigation, she began working as a campaigner and adviser to the French government on oceans and marine protection. 

Since becoming a Member of the European Parliament, Chabaud has been serving on the Committee on Development. In this capacity, she authored a 2021 report on marine plastic. 

In addition to her committee assignments, Chabaud is part of the European Parliament Intergroup on Climate Change, Biodiversity and Sustainable Development, the European Parliament Intergroup on Seas, Rivers, Islands and Coastal Areas and the MEPs Against Cancer group.

References

1962 births
Living people
MEPs for France 2019–2024
21st-century women MEPs for France
Democratic Movement (France) MEPs
French sailors
European Democratic Party MEPs
French Vendee Globe sailors
1996 Vendee Globe sailors
2000 Vendee Globe sailors
Vendée Globe finishers
Single-handed circumnavigating sailors